This is a list of newspapers in Hong Kong. Hong Kong is home to many of Asia's biggest English and Chinese language newspapers. The territory has one of the world's largest press industries and is a major centre for print journalism.

Overview

Popularity
The Chinese language newspapers Headline Daily and Oriental Daily News have the highest shares in the Hong Kong newspaper market, while the Hong Kong Economic Times is the best-selling financial newspaper. The Standard, a free tabloid with a mass market strategy, is the most widely circulated English newspaper by a significant margin. Its rival, South China Morning Post, has the most paid subscribers among English-language papers in Hong Kong.

Paparazzi
Apple Daily had one of the highest circulations before its closing, due to their approach. They used an informal style, concentrating on celebrity gossip and paparazzi photography. Apple Daily had brash news style, sensationalist news reportage and was known for its anti-government political positions. The Chinese language publications were written to some degree with colloquial Cantonese phrases.

Number and price
The number of newspapers in the market has been stable for a long time. There are occasional attempts at establishing new types of newspaper and theme-oriented papers, but most of these new papers cannot compete with the more mainstream papers. However, the entry into the market of free newspapers Metropolis Daily, Headline Daily, am730, and The Epoch Times has spurred competition. In September 2007, The Standard changed its business model from a traditional daily into a free-sheet, distributed in commercial districts like Central and Admiralty.

Most papers sell at the cover price of HK$9-10, except South China Morning Post (HK$9, while the Sunday edition, Sunday Morning Post, costs HK$10). The economic recession brought about by SARS in 2003 led to some resellers pricing at $1 below the recommended price. According to the HK Newspaper Hawkers Association, the situation has lasted through to 2008, and some 10% of sellers maintain the cut price despite the change in the prevailing economic climate. The Association urges a return to resale price maintenance.

Chinese-language newspapers
Newspapers in Hong Kong are known to follow a particular political stance, with most being either pro-Beijing or pro-democracy. Some newspapers are completely neutral, or are oriented towards finance or religion. A few papers, such as Oriental Daily, Apple Daily, and The Sun are known for their sensational style, such as publishing gory pictures (e.g., of road accidents or murder scenes), and engaging in borderline obscene coverage (including "prostitution guides") on a regular basis.
Hong Kong Commercial Daily (香港商報)
Hong Kong Economic Journal (信報財經新聞)
Hong Kong Economic Times (香港經濟日報)
Kung Kao Po (公教報)
Ming Pao (明報)
Oriental Daily News (東方日報)
Passion Times (熱血時報)
Sing Pao Daily News (成報)
Sing Tao Daily (星島日報)
Ta Kung Pao (大公報)
Wen Wei Po (文匯報)
The Epoch Times (大紀元時報)(no longer free since 2019)

Online only 
Dot Dot News (點新聞)
HK01 (香港01)

Free tabloids 
am730
Headline Daily (頭條日報)
Vision Times (看中国)(limited number of free papers per week)

English-language newspapers
Career Times
China Daily Hong Kong Edition
South China Morning Post (published continuously since 1903, except from December 1941 to August 1945)
The Sunday Morning Post (Sunday edition of South China Morning Post)
Young Post (the student section of South China Morning Post)
The Standard (formerly HK-iMail, and earlier Hong Kong Standard) a free newspaper
Sunday Examiner (Roman Catholic)

From 10 September 2007, The Standard switched to free, advertising-supported distribution. The South China Morning Post  announced on 11 December 2015 that the Alibaba Group would acquire the South China Morning Post from Malaysian tycoon Robert Kuok, who had owned it since 1993. As of 5 April 2016, the South China Morning Post's online content became free to read.

Hong Kong is also the base of regional editions of foreign English-language newspapers. The International New York Times and Financial Times are published in Hong Kong.

Online only 
Hong Kong Free Press
Asia Times

Other language newspapers
 Hong Kong Post (香港ポスト) (Japanese)
Suara (Indonesian)

Defunct newspapers

Chinese-language

English-language

Online only

See also

Newspaper Society of Hong Kong
Hong Kong Audit Bureau of Circulations
Media of Hong Kong
Censorship in Hong Kong
List of newspapers in China

Notes

References

Hong Kong
Hong Kong
 Newspapers published in Hong Kong
Newspapers